The Whetstone Mountains is a mountain range in Cochise County, southeastern Arizona.

Geography

The range is located south of Interstate 10, between the Santa Rita Mountains to the west, and the Dragoon Mountains to the east.  Higher elevations of the major ranges in the region are in the Madrean Sky Islands ecoregion, with sky island habitats.

Located within the Coronado National Forest, the Whetstone Mountains are in its Sierra Vista Recreation Area, with access via hiking trails.

Kartchner Caverns State Park is in the eastern foothills of the Whetstone Mountains, on Arizona State Route 90. The trailhead for the Foothills Loop Trail is in the park.

Peaks
Peaks in the range include: 
Apache Peak, 7711 ft
French Peak, 7675 ft; 
Granite Peak, 7420 ft — southern section. 
Cottonwood Peak, 7100 ft — northeast section.
East Peak, at 6681 ft — eastern section.

History
At Iron Springs, within the Whetstones is where Wyatt Earp fought in a gunfight during the Earp Vendetta Ride, 1882.

References

External links 
  Visual overview Saguaro Juniper Corp.

Mountain ranges of Cochise County, Arizona
San Pedro Valley (Arizona)
Madrean Sky Islands mountain ranges
Coronado National Forest
Mountain ranges of Arizona